Classical Academy High School (CAHS) is a public charter school located in Escondido, California. First enrollment began in 2006, offering grades 9 and 10. In 2007, 11th grades positions were open. Beginning in the 2008-2009 school year, CAHS offered grades 9-12. The Principal for CAHS is Dana Moen.

CAHS is part of a group of four charter schools; other are Coastal Academy, Classical Academy Vista, and Classical Academy Online.

Program choices 

CAHS offers 2 program choices for students: Studio and Family 
 
 Studio: This program allows students to take all of their courses on campus Tuesday – Friday with a credentialed teacher. 
 Family: This program allows students to take all of their courses off-site under the supervision of a credentialed teacher and their parent or guardian. 
Students may also blend between the programs as well as take concurrent enrollment at the community college.

Recently they opened a new campus, Classical Academy Online with Dr. Stacey Perez as principal, replacing their old 'Online' program and cybercafe.

Academics 

A wide range of college prep, honors, Advanced Placement, and elective classes are available for students to choose from. , current Advanced Placement courses include US History, Calculus AB, Calculus BC, Statistics, English Language and Composition, English Literature and Composition, Spanish Language and Culture, Psychology, Biology, World History and Government. Elective choices at CAHS include: Art, Digital Media, Photography, New Media and Video Production, Journalism, Drama, Music Appreciation, Choir, Play Production, Robotics, Synthetic Biology, ASB-Leadership, Work Experience, Office Aide, Teacher's Aide, Dance, Speech, Debate, Anatomy, Psychology, Sports Medicine, Life Skills, and others. Students also have the ability to take elective classes at a local community college or through the local Regional Occupation Program.

CAHS follows a quarter system, where students take 3-4 courses at a time. The majority of the courses are considered "accelerated" where a year's worth of content is covered in 18 weeks. Courses that meet for a full 36 weeks include all levels of math, Advanced Placement courses, physical education, and some of the elective classes.

The average class size is 25-30 students.

Mascot

The official mascot for Classical Academy High School is the Caiman.

Sports 

CAHS is a member of the California Interscholastic Federation (CIF) and participates in the Coastal Conference. CAHS offers the following sports for the 2021-22 school year:
Fall: Boys Beach Volleyball, Boys Water Polo, Cross Country, Football, Girls Golf, Girls Tennis, and Girls Volleyball
Winter: Boys and Girls Basketball, Boys and Girls Soccer, Girls Water Polo, and Mountain Biking
Spring: Baseball, Boys Tennis, Boys Volleyball, Girls Beach Volleyball, Boys Golf, Boys and Girls Lacrosse, Softball, STUNT, Swim & Dive, and Swim & Dive
The Boys' Golf team brought the very first league title to CAHS in 2011-12. The Boys' soccer team won the league championships in 2012 and 2013. The Girls' Varsity Volleyball team brought home the CIF Championship banner in 2013. The (no-longer active) Ice Hockey team participated in the ADHSHL (Anaheim Ducks High School Hockey League).

Notable alumni

See also
List of high schools in San Diego County, California

References

External links
Escondido Unified High School District

High schools in San Diego County, California
Charter high schools in California
Education in Escondido, California
Educational institutions established in 2006
2006 establishments in California